The 1960 Florida State Seminoles football team represented Florida State University in the 1960 NCAA University Division football season. In 1960, Bill Peterson became head coach, and he coached 11 seasons, and compiled a 62–42–11 record.

Schedule

References

Florida State
Florida State Seminoles football seasons
Florida State Seminoles football